The Red Tapeworm is a 1941 comedy novel by the British writer Compton Mackenzie. It is a satire on the wartime economic measures imposed by the government during the Second World War.

References

Bibliography
 Burton, Alan. Historical Dictionary of British Spy Fiction. Rowman & Littlefield, 2016.

1941 British novels
Novels by Compton Mackenzie
British comedy novels
Chatto & Windus books